Roody Lormera (born December 22, 1982) is a Haitian football player, who plays as a striker.

Club career
Lormera started his career at Haitian club Roulado before moving abroad to play for clubs in Argentina, Honduras and Costa Rica.

International career
He made his debut for Haiti in a November 2002 Gold Cup qualifying match against Antigua and Barbuda, in which he immediately scored a goal. He scored another goal in his second game against the Netherlands Antilles four days later. He played in 3 World Cup qualification matches in 2004 in which he also scored a goal.

External links

References

1982 births
Living people
Haitian footballers
Hispano players
Expatriate footballers in Argentina
Haitian expatriate sportspeople in Argentina
Expatriate footballers in Honduras
Haitian expatriate sportspeople in Honduras
Expatriate footballers in Costa Rica
Haitian expatriate sportspeople in Costa Rica
Liga Nacional de Fútbol Profesional de Honduras players
Haiti international footballers
Association football forwards